Elections to Ellesmere Port and Neston Borough Council were held on 3 May 2007. One third of the council was up for election and the Labour party stayed in overall control of the council. Overall turnout was 30.3%.

After the election, the composition of the council was
Labour 24
Conservative 17
Liberal Democrat 2

Results

Ward results

References
2007 Ellesmere Port and Neston election result
Big night for Tories in local elections
Ward results

2007 English local elections
2007
2000s in Cheshire